Samuel Boyle may refer to:

 Samuel Boyle (journalist) (1948–2008), American journalist
 Sam Boyle (c. 1878–1923), American football player and coach